Vernoil-le-Fourrier is a commune in the Maine-et-Loire department in western France.

The commune was formerly called Vernoil, and was officially renamed Vernoil-le-Fourrier on 7 July 2006.

See also
Communes of the Maine-et-Loire department

References

Vernoillefourrier